Abkhazia–Syria relations refers to the bilateral relationship between the Republic of Abkhazia and Syria. Syria recognised Abkhazia on 29 May 2018. The establishment of relations on an embassy-level was announced very early.

In 2008, Syrian president Bashar al-Assad said that Syria agrees "with the essence of the Russian position" in the Abkhaz conflict. In 2013, Abkhazia appointed a Representative of the Abkhaz Foreign Ministry in Syria.

In 2015, the Abkhaz Foreign Minister met Syrian Ambassador to Russia Riad Haddad in Moscow and afterwards said that his government believes Syria will recognize the former Georgian republic of Abkhazia's independence as a sovereign country in the future. In November 2016, President of Abkhazia Raul Khajimba stressed his country's support to Syria in its "war against international terrorism". On the same occasion, Khajimba called Syria a "sisterly country". Nonetheless, Abkhazia supports the re-migration of Syrian citizens of Abkhaz descent back into Abkhazia. In the first five years of the Civil War, about 500 Syrians remigrated to Abkhazia. In December 2015, the Foreign Minister of Abkhazia met with Ambassador Extraordinary and Plenipotentiary of the Syrian Arab Republic in Russia Mr. Riyad Haddad and they discussed the remigration of Syrian citizens of Abkhaz descent. In December 2016, the first match in Freestyle wrestling between national teams Abkhazia and Syria was held in Sukhum. In August 2017, Abkhazia provided humanitarian aid to Syria. Also in August 2017, an Abkhaz delegation led by Abkhaz Foreign Minister Daur Kove went to Damascus and met with Syrian Prime Minister Imad Khamis. Parliamentary delegations discussed the strengthening of parliamentary relations between both countries. The same month, Abkhaz products were presented at the Damascus International Fair. In November 2017, a Syrian delegation was in Abkhazia and the Abkhaz minister of economy Adgur Ardzinba, said he was preparing a free trade agreement between Syria and Abkhazia. In December 2017, there were first reports that a Syrian recognition of Abkhaz independence may be possible.

In May 2018, the Syrian government recognized Abkhazia, resulting in condemnation from Georgia and the United States. As a result, Georgia severed ties with Syria.

In early September 2018, President Abkhazia, Raul Khajimba paid a state visit to Damascus, Syria. Khajimba met with Bashar al-Assad and high dignitaries in Damascus. Bashar al-Assad decorated Raul Khajimba with the Umayyad Order, the highest decoration of the Syrian Arab Republic. Raul Khajimba also decorated Bashar al-Assad with the Apzha Order I Degree, the highest Abkhazia state decoration. The leaders of the two countries also exchanged gifts and presents from both nations. Abkhazia and Syria agreed to a Comprehensive Treaty of Strategic Partnership and Diplomatic Relationship between Abkhazia and Syria.

The exchange between Abkhazia and Syria has increased since recognition in late 2018. In late September 2019, a delegation consisting of Syrian businessmen and parliament members visited Sukhumi to honor the Independence and Victory Day of Abkhazia. In October 2020, Abkhazia opened an embassy in Damascus.

In May 2021, the Abkhaz president Aslan Bzhania visited Syria on a state visit and met with Bashar al-Assad.

See also
 Foreign relations of Abkhazia
 Foreign relations of Syria

References

 
Syria
Bilateral relations of Syria